Yuriy Yuriyovych Polyukhovych (born 1 November 1980) is a Ukrainian historian and civil servant. On 10 March 2020, he was appointed as the Acting Minister of Education and Science. On 23 dec. 2022 he was appointed as Ambassador Extraordinary and Plenipotentiary of Ukraine to the Republic of Peru.

Biography 

He received a Master's degree in History from the National University of Kyiv-Mohyla Academy. Polyukhovych is a Candidate of Historical Sciences.

Since 2000, he represents Ukraine at the European Association of Mayanists.

From 2014 to 2016, he was an adviser to the Minister of Education and Science.

Since 2017, he is the head of the Ukrainian Science Research Foundation.

In September 2019, Polyukhovych was appointed First Deputy Minister of Education and Science.

See also 
 Shmyhal Government

References

External links 
 

1980 births
Living people
People from Kostopil
21st-century Ukrainian historians
National University of Kyiv-Mohyla Academy alumni
Mayanists
Ukrainian civil servants
Education and science ministers of Ukraine
Independent politicians in Ukraine
21st-century Ukrainian politicians